Lox is a fillet of brined salmon, which may be smoked. Lox is frequently served on a bagel with cream cheese, and often garnished with tomato, sliced onion, cucumbers, and capers.

Etymology
The American English word lox is a borrowing of Yiddish laks, itself derived from Middle High German lahs (modern German form is Lachs) stemming from Proto-Germanic *lahsaz and ultimately Proto-Indo-European (PIE) *laks. Lax, chiefly a British English word for salmon, is a doublet of the word inherited from Middle English. The word has various cognates in various Indo-European languages. For example, cured salmon in Scandinavian countries is known by different versions of the name gravlax or gravad laks, with lax meaning salmon. The word is so remarkably widespread and stable across IE languages that it probably existed in its current form in a PIE language.

Preparation
The traditional belly lox is known as such because it is made from the fatty fish belly. The cut is described as "paper-thin". Traditionally, the product is unsmoked and preserved by dry curing, leading to a very salty taste. As a result of consumer preferences, mass-produced "lox" generally use less salt and add cold smoke, making them more similar to a "Nova" (see below). A different cut may be used too in these versions.

A Nova or Nova Scotia salmon, sometimes called Nova lox, is cured with a milder brine and then cold-smoked. The cut remains thin, making it a middle ground between the old belly lox and regular smoked salmon. The name dates from a time when much of the salmon in New York City came from Nova Scotia. Today, however, the name only refers to the style of preparation and has no bearing on the source of the fish: they may come from other waters or even be raised on farms.

Similar dishes  
The following salmon dishes are almost never considered a lox in the bagel context, as a thicker cut is used.

Scotch or Scottish-style salmon. A rub of salt and sometimes sugars, spices, and other flavorings is applied directly to the meat of the fish; this is called "dry-brining" or "Scottish-style." The brine mixture is then rinsed off, and the fish is cold-smoked. 
Gravad lax (laks) or gravlax. The traditional Nordic means of preparing salmon, coating with or immersing the fish in a rub of dill, sugar, and salt and dry-curing it. The seasoning mixture may also variously include juniper berry, fennel, allspice or coriander. It is often served with a sweet mustard-dill sauce.

Other similar brined and smoked fish products include chubs, sable, smoked sturgeon, smoked whitefish, and kippered herring.  These delicacies are popular in delis and gourmet stores, particularly in Northeastern US cities that received significant Jewish, Eastern European and Russian immigration, such as New York City, Philadelphia and Chicago.

See also

 List of smoked foods
 Smoking (cooking)
 Smoked sable
 Dishwasher salmon
 Smoked salmon

References

Ashkenazi Jewish cuisine
Salmon dishes
Yiddish words and phrases
Fish processing
Smoked fish